Edward Everett Smith (May 5, 1861 – July 29, 1931) was a Minnesota legislator and the 18th Lieutenant Governor of Minnesota. Born in Spring Valley, Minnesota and became Lieutenant Governor under Governor Adolph Olson Eberhart from September 25, 1909 – January 3, 1911. He died in 1931 in Minneapolis.

References
Minnesota Historical Society
Minnesota Legislators Past and Present

1861 births
1931 deaths
Lieutenant Governors of Minnesota
Republican Party Minnesota state senators
Republican Party members of the Minnesota House of Representatives
People from Spring Valley, Minnesota